Ali Abdullah Abdurahman Aloob (born 31 October 1993) is a Qatari footballer who plays as a winger.

References

1993 births
Living people
Qatari footballers
Association football forwards
Al-Gharafa SC players
Muaither SC players
Al-Sailiya SC players
Al Kharaitiyat SC players
Al-Arabi SC (Qatar) players
Al-Khor SC players
Qatar Stars League players
Qatari Second Division players